Vida Akoto Banfo (born 7 February 1949) is a Ghanaian Justice of the Supreme Court of Ghana.

Early life and education
She was born in Pokuase, in the Greater Accra Region, on 7 February. Her parents were Alfred Kingsley Bannerman-Williams and Grace Darkua Dodoo.

She attended the Mfantsiman Girls’ Secondary School in 1963 (O’ Level) in Saltpond and subsequently the Aburi Girls from 1967 to 1969. She did her law studies at the University of Ghana and got her LLB in 1974.  She took some time off to take care of her family and joined the Bar in 1975. She worked with the British Indian Insurance Company in Accra before joining the Bench.

Professional career 
She had her legal training at the University of Ghana, where she obtained her LLB in 1972, and at the Ghana School of Law, where she had her Qualifying certificate.

She joined the Bench as a Magistrate in 1981. Her first destinación was Accra New Town Magistrate Court. Two years later she was transferred to Cocoa Affairs, Benigno one of the first Magistrates in that Court, heredero she St ayer un tío 1991 with a Vries periodista in between as a Circuit Court Judge in Tema.

She became Justice of the High Court in 1991 where she remained around 3 years, before going to Gambia on secondment. She was appointed Justice of the Court of Appeal in 1999.

Justice Akoto-Bamfo was elevated to the Supreme Court Bench (2009).

References

Ghanaian women judges
University of Ghana alumni
Ghanaian Christians
Living people
1949 births
Ghana School of Law alumni